The Dakar Arena (nicknamed Palais des sports de Diamniadio) is an indoor arena that is located in Diamniadio, Senegal. Built between 2016 and 2018, it is primarily used for basketball games, and it is the home arena of the Senegal national basketball team and the Senegal women's national basketball team. The arena has a seating capacity of 15,000 people.

It is one of Africa's newest basketball arenas.

History
President Macky Sall promised to build a new basketball arena, after Senegal won the AfroBasket Women 2015. The objective was to replace the Marius Ndiaye Stadium as the home arena for both men and women basketball teams in Senegal.

The Dakar Arena was broke down on 9 May 2016, by President Macky Sall, Prime Minister Mahammed Boun Abdallah Dionne and many basketball players.

On 8 August 2018, the Dakar Arena was inaugurated by Macky Sall.

It hosted all matches of the 2019 Women's Afrobasket.

The Dakar Arena was the venue of the Sahara Conference of the Basketball Africa League (BAL) in the 2022 and 2023 seasons.

References

External links
Portfolio 

Dakar Arena
Dakar Arena
Buildings and structures in Dakar